Sean Friars (born 15 May 1979) is a football coach and former player. He is the assistant manager of NIFL Premiership club Institute and works for the Depaul Foyle Haven Centre, which helps people afflicted by addiction issues and homelessness in Derry. As a former addict he is now fully focused on helping people struggling with some of the demons that wrecked his own football career.

His brother Emmet also played as a defender.

Playing career

Early career
Friars was born in Derry, Northern Ireland. Prior to his move to Cliftonville, he played for Foyle Harps, Liverpool, Ipswich Town, Portadown, Newry Town, Derry City and Finn Harps.

Friars made only one appearance, as substitute, for Ipswich Town. He came on against Crewe Alexandra in a 2–1 home win at Portman Road.

In 2001, he had a short-term deal with Newry Town which expired in September.

In March 2004 a loan deal from Derry City to Finn Harps was announced. The left-sided midfielder, had been a member of Derry City's 2002 FAI Cup winning team. After returning from a loan spell with League of Ireland First Division club Finn Harps, it was announced in August 2004 that he had left Derry City by mutual agreement.

Cliftonville
Friars made his Cliftonville debut in August 2004 in a friendly match against Holywood During his first year at Cliftonville, Friars was included in the 2004–05 Irish League Team of the Year. Friars returned to Cliftonville from a spell at Limavady United where he spent the latter half of the 2006–07 season.

In October 2006 there was some doubt over his future with Cliftonville after he went absent from the club and was subsequently dropped from the squad for a number of matches.

He remained with Cliftonville and recently had an "outstanding" match in their second leg away win in the UEFA Intertoto Cup in July 2007.

Newry City
Friars sealed a return to Newry City in the summer of 2007 where he proved himself as a vital member of the team scoring 8 goals in his first 14 matches. His brother Emmett was also in the Newry City team.

Institute
In January 2009 Friars was transferred to Institute for an undisclosed fee, signing a 2-year contract.

Dungannon Swifts
On the same day as his brother Emmet Friars, 3 January 2012, Sean joined Dungannon Swifts.

International career
Friars played for the Northern Ireland U21 national team, also captaining the side.

Coaching career

Institute (academy)
Friars was appointed as Institute Under-20 team manager in the summer of 2016 and went on to win back to back Championship titles with the team.

Limavady United
Friars left his role at Institute to take on his first senior managerial job with Limavady United on 19 May 2018.

Institute return
On 3 May 2019, Friars returned to old club Institute as assistant manager, following relegation from the NIFL Championship with Limavady. He took on the role; initially, as assistant to John Quigg and maintained the position, following Quigg's resignation and the appointment of Sean Connor.

Honours
Derry City
 FAI Cup: 2002

References

External links

1979 births
Living people
Association footballers from Northern Ireland
Sportspeople from Derry (city)
Liverpool F.C. players
Ipswich Town F.C. players
Portadown F.C. players
Carlisle United F.C. players
Newry City F.C. players
Derry City F.C. players
League of Ireland players
Finn Harps F.C. players
Cliftonville F.C. players
Institute F.C. players
NIFL Premiership players
Association football forwards
Dungannon Swifts F.C. players
English Football League players
Irish expatriate sportspeople in England
Expatriate footballers in England